The 2015 Priceline Pharmacy Classic took place between 13-16 January at the Kooyong Stadium in Melbourne, Australia.

Seeds

Draw

Main draw

References
 Main Draw

External links
Official Website

Kooyong Classic
AAMI Classic